The Alicurá Dam (in Spanish, Embalse de Alicurá) is the first of five dams on the Limay River in northwestern Argentine Patagonia (the Comahue region), about  from the city of San Carlos de Bariloche and  above mean sea level. It was inaugurated in 1985.

The dam is used primarily for the generation of hydroelectricity with an installed capacity of 1,050 MW. The reservoir is also employed to raise Salmonidae.

References

External links

Dams completed in 1985
Energy infrastructure completed in 1985
Dams in Argentina
Hydroelectric power stations in Argentina
Buildings and structures in Neuquén Province
Buildings and structures in Río Negro Province
Dams on the Limay River